Germany's third gender law introduced the gender "diverse" as a third option in alternative to "female" and "male" in the German civil status register. 

The law, codified in § 45b PStG, laid down an administrative procedure for assigning a diverse gender. It requires a doctor's note confirming "a variant of sex development". The diverse gender can be assigned to people listed in the register, at birth or later in life. When individuals change their legal gender later in life, they can also change their first name.

The administrative process is officially aimed at intersex people, but nonbinary people (who were not intersex) have also tried to use it, due to its manageable burden compared to the gender entry change procedure for trans people (Transsexuellengesetz). However, the Federal Court of Justice ruled on 22 April 2020 that § 45b could not be used by a nonbinary person who was not intersex.

The third gender law took effect on 22 December 2018.

Legislative history 

Germany got a third gender option because, on 10 October 2017, the Federal Constitutional Court's ruled that it was constitutionally necessary. The court decided that it was unconstitutional to refuse a third gender option for people "not clearly identifiable" as female or male,⁣ citing Articles 1, 2, and 3 of the German constitution. This ruling came in response to a constitutional complaint by Vanja, an at the time 26-year-old intersex person from Leipzig. Vanja had sued his way up to the constitutional court.

The constitutional court ruling for the right to a third gender came shortly after federal elections in 2017. The elections led to the formation of a grand coalition of Christian Democrats, Social Democrats and the Christian Social Union. The coalition agreement was signed on 12 March 2018, and Horst Seehofer (Christian Social Union) became minister of the interior.

Minister Seehofer's legal draft provided for the third gender to be called "other". However, justice minister Katarina Barley and family minister Franziska Giffey, both of the social democrats, blocked this proposal. In their view, "other" was disparaging. Barley favoured "further" while Giffey preferred "inter/diverse".

The government draft, hashed out within the grand coalition, settled on a third gender entry called , as well as an option for an empty gender entry.

Trivia 

The booking form was made by the regional public doctors' association .

See also 

 Legal recognition of intersex people
 Legal recognition of non-binary gender
 Intersex rights in Germany
 Transgender rights in Germany

References 

Transgender rights in Germany
Intersex rights in Germany
Fourth Merkel cabinet
Third Merkel cabinet